= Bill Rohrbach =

American politician

Member of the Wyoming House of Representatives
- In office 1987–1992

Personal details
- Born: February 24, 1943 Chicago, Illinois, U.S.
- Died: December 23, 2007 (aged 64)
- Party: Republican
- Education: St. Ambrose College; University of Wyoming

Bill Rohrbach (February 24, 1943 – December 23, 2007) was an American politician. He served as a Republican member of the Wyoming House of Representatives.

== Life and career ==
Rohrbach was born in Chicago, Illinois. He attended St. Ambrose College and the University of Wyoming.

Rohrbach served in the Wyoming House of Representatives from 1987 to 1992.

Rohrbach died on December 23, 2007, at the age of 64.
